Cnemaspis thayawthadangyi, the Thayawthadangyi Islands rock gecko, is a species of diurnal, rock-dwelling, insectivorous gecko endemic to  Myanmar. It is distributed in the Tanintharyi Region.

References

 Cnemaspis thayawthadangyi

thayawthadangyi
Reptiles of Myanmar
Reptiles described in 2019